Gino Ferrer Callegari (April 14, 1911 in Padua – April 14, 1954 in Genoa) was an Italian professional football player and coach.

He played for 10 seasons (198 games, 11 goals) in the Serie A for Calcio Padova, A.S. Roma, Sampierdarenese, A.S. Lucchese Libertas 1905 and A.C. Liguria.

1911 births
1954 deaths
Deaths from leukemia
Deaths from cancer in Liguria
Italian footballers
Serie A players
Calcio Padova players
A.S. Roma players
U.C. Sampdoria players
S.S.D. Lucchese 1905 players
Italian football managers
Association football midfielders